According to Tibetan Buddhist myth, Gyalpo Pehar ( [also spelt: pe kar & dpe dkar]) is a spirit belonging to the gyalpo class. When Padmasambhava arrived in Tibet in the eighth century, he subdued all gyalpo spirits and put them under control of Gyalpo Pehar, who promised not to harm any sentient beings and was made the chief guardian spirit of Samye during the reign of Trisong Deutsen. Pehar is the leader of a band of five gyalpo spirits and would later become the protector deity of Nechung Monastery in the 17th century under the auspices of the Fifth Dalai Lama. 

After the fall of the Western Xia, the influx of Tangut refugees into Tibet led to the adoption of Pehar into Tibetan Buddhism, eventually in the important role as the state oracle, the Nechung Oracle.

References

External links
  Buddhist Worldly Protector: Pehar - at HimalayanArt.org
 Deity King Pehar
 Pehar
Dorje Legpa Votive Plaque at the University of Michigan Museum of Art

Dharmapalas